Amblytelus montiswilsoni is a species of ground beetle in the subfamily Psydrinae. It was described by Baehr in 2004.

References

Amblytelus
Beetles described in 2004